This is a list of Brazilian television related events from 1992.

Events

Debuts

Television shows

1970s
Turma da Mônica (1976–present)

Ending this year
Xou da Xuxa (1986-1992)

Births
6 January - Rodrigo Simas, actor
19 January - Agatha Moreira, actress & model

Deaths

See also
1992 in Brazil